Mucronella bresadolae is a species of fungus in the family Clavariaceae. It was originally described by French mycologist Lucien Quélet in 1888 as Clavaria bresadolae. E.J.H. Corner transferred it to the genus Mucronella in 1970. It is found in Europe and North America.

References

External links

Clavariaceae
Fungi described in 1888
Fungi of Europe
Fungi of North America
Taxa named by Lucien Quélet